Bielawa  is a town in southwestern Poland. Since 1999, it has been situated in Dzierżoniów County, Lower Silesian Voivodeship. From 1975 to 1998, it was part of the Wałbrzych Voivodeship. As of December 2021, it has a population of 29,232.

Bielawa lies in the central part of Lower Silesia, along the Bielawica stream in the Owl Mountains region.

Bielawa lies at an altitude range of 280 and 964 m above sea level, in the Owl Mountains. The town is a year-round tourist destination; its outdoor attractions include four major hiking trails of varying difficulty in an  park, as well as cycling trails and ski lifts.

History
The oldest known mention of Bielawa dates back to 1288, when it was part of fragmented Piast-ruled Poland. Its name is of Polish origin and is derived from the word biela, bila, current Polish biała ("white").

In 1720 the first brick house was built in the village and in 1741 it was captured and afterwards annexed by Prussia. In 1805 Christian Dierig founded a weaving company (Christian Dierig AG). During the Napoleonic Wars, the village was occupied by France. In 1844 it was the site of the Weavers' Uprising, brutally crushed by the Prussians. From 1871 to 1945 it was part of Germany. In 1891 the Dzierżoniów–Bielawa railway line opened. In 1924 Bielawa obtained town rights. During World War II the Germans established the FAL Langenbielau II subcamp of the Gross-Rosen concentration camp in the town. In 1945 it was captured by the Soviets and eventually reintegrated with Poland. Greeks, refugees of the Greek Civil War, settled in Bielawa in the 1950s.

Demographics

Main sights
There are numerous historical buildings in Bielawa. At its center is the 19th-century Neo-Gothic Church of the Assumption with a 101 m tall tower, the third tallest in Poland. Other buildings include a late-Renaissance palace originally built as a fortified manor house; the Church of the Corpus Christi, erected in 1743; and numerous 18th-century Baroque houses that were restored in the 19th and early 20th centuries. It is also a home to a number of medieval penitential crosses.

International relations

Twin towns - sister cities
Bielawa is twinned with:

  Chatham-Kent, Canada
  Ciechanów, Poland
  Hronov, Czech Republic
  Kostelec nad Orlicí, Czech Republic
  Lingen, Germany

Surroundings
 Gola Dzierżoniowska Castle
 Medieval town of Niemcza
 Cistercian monastery at Henryków

Notable people

 Jeremiah Dencke (1725−1795), composer
 Ferdinand Gottlieb Flechtner (1811–1867), German industrialist
 Adolph Franz (1842–1916), German politician
 Friedrich Dierig (1845–1931), German industrialist
 Arthur Philipp Flechtner (1858–1936), Prussian General
 Karl Franz (1881–1967), German politician
 Georg Muschner (1885–1971), German cinematographer 
 Walter Möse (1920–1944), Wehrmacht Oberfeldwebel 
 Waltraut Engelberg (born 1929), author and wife of Ernst Engelberg
 Johann Alexander Wisniewsky (1929–2012), German industrialist
 Horst Weigang (born 1940), German athlete
 Eleni Tzoka (born 1956), Polish singer
 Aleksandra Kwasniewska (born 1978), Polish singer
 Robert Skibniewski (born 1983), Polish basketball player
 Jarosław Kuźniar (born 1979), Polish journalist and TV presenter
 Janusz Góra (born 1963), Polish footballer
 Art Binkowski (born 1975), Polish-Canadian boxer
 Jarosław Jach (born 1994), Polish footballer

Gallery

References

External links

 Official website 
 Jewish Community of Bielawa on Virtual Shtetl

Cities and towns in Lower Silesian Voivodeship
Dzierżoniów County
Cities in Silesia